Robert Wright Lee IV is an American Protestant minister, activist, author, and newspaper columnist.

Early life and education 
Lee was born and raised in Statesville, North Carolina, United States. He was baptized at Broad Street United Methodist Church in Statesville, and was raised in the United Methodist faith. He completed his undergraduate studies at Appalachian State University in Boone, where he majored in Appalachian studies and religious studies. In 2017, he received a Master of Theological Studies degree from Duke Divinity School in Durham. While at Duke, Lee had an academic concentration in practical theology and homiletics. 

Through his father, Robert W. Lee III, Lee is a descendant of Robert Scothrup Lee, a Confederate States Army veteran and farmer from Butler County, Alabama. His great-great-great-great-grandfather, William Lee, was a pioneer in early Alabama politics, having served in the Alabama State Legislature and as a court judge after immigrating to the United States from England.

Relation to General Robert E. Lee 
In the summer of 2016, then an intern at Edenton Street United Methodist Church in Raleigh, North Carolina, Rev. Lee submitted an Op-Ed piece to the "Act of Faith" section of The Washington Post. In it, he wrote that he was "related to the Lees of Virginia." The following summer, Rev. Lee appeared at the televised MTV Awards show at the LA Forum and announced that he was "a descendant of Robert E. Lee." In 2019, he published a paperback autobiography in which he states that his grandmother, "Nana," told him when he was a child sitting on her knee: "See that painting over there, the one of General Lee on the horse? You are related to him, a nephew separated by many generations." Since his appearance on the MTV Video Music Awards on August 27, 2017, he has become known for his efforts to "especially challenge white Christians in America to take seriously the deadly legacy of slavery." Following a backlash from parishioners and others in the community after the appearance, Lee announced that he was stepping down from the pulpit of the Bethany United Church of Christ in Winston-Salem. The church issued a statement saying that Lee was not asked to leave, and that church leaders were unaware the  problem existed.

Activism 
On June 4, 2020, Reverend Lee was invited by Virginia governor Ralph Northam to speak at a televised press conference in support of Northam's desire to remove Lee's equestrian statue from Monument Avenue in Richmond. Governor Northam introduced Lee with the statement that "we have been talking about his great-grandfather."  Lee replied that he was Robert E. Lee's nephew, "so many greats removed of course." Lee explained his stance on removal of the statue, stating that while there are more important things to address than statues, "the monument has become an idol for many to the Lost Cause."

On June 7, 2020, Lee published an opinion piece in The Washington Post calling for the replacement of the mythology of the "Lost Cause" of the Civil War.

Investigation by media 
On May 14, 2021, The Washington Post "Fact Checker" examined historical and genealogical records and determined that Reverend Lee is the direct descendant of Confederate Private Robert S. Lee of Alabama, and further concluded "the pastor should not state he is related to Robert E. Lee, especially in legal filings — and news organizations should not echo this claim." Their conclusions were based on finding no evidence the Reverend is a direct descendant of Robert E. Lee's older brother, Charles Carter Lee, stating that Reverend Lee had made this claim when appearing in Tulsa, Oklahoma, in January 2020, and not on analysis of the Reverend's other paternal lines, or any of his maternal lines. After repeated requests from The Washington Post, neither Rob Lee or his father produced evidence to confirm his claim that he was a distant nephew of the Confederate General. On February 1, 2022, CNN cited an Axios report which stated that Rev. Robert W. Lee IV was in fact a "a close and multiple cousin" of General Robert E. Lee.

The report linking Reverend Lee to Charles Carter Lee directly was originally published in the Tulsa World on January 17, 2020, before the Reverend's event there. It stated that Reverend Lee was a direct descendant of Charles Carter Lee, but did not quote or attribute this to the Reverend. On November 16, 2021, the Tulsa World corrected its article to remove the reference to a direct descendancy of Reverend Lee from Charles Carter Lee as its error and noted that the Reverend does not make this claim. On February 1, 2022, it was reported that Rev. Robert W. Lee IV was in fact a collateral descendant of General Robert E. Lee, not direct.

References 

Living people
21st-century American biographers
Activists from North Carolina
American anti-racism activists
American columnists
American male non-fiction writers
American Protestant ministers and clergy
Appalachian State University alumni
Duke Divinity School alumni
Robert Wright
People from Statesville, North Carolina
Religious leaders from North Carolina
Writers from North Carolina
Year of birth missing (living people)